"Herculean" is the debut single by the Good, the Bad & the Queen, an alternative rock band fronted by Damon Albarn. Though Albarn later claimed that the band was unnamed, and that "The Good, The Bad & The Queen" was merely the name of band's first album, this single clearly credits the artist as "The Good, The Bad & The Queen", and was released several months in advance of the album. At the time, neither Albarn nor anyone else was claiming the band was unnamed.

"Herculean" was first released as the band's debut single on 30 October 2006, following the band's performance at The Roundhouse in Camden on 26 October as part of the BBC's Electric Proms (see 2006 in British music). The single peaked at number 22 in the UK Singles Chart upon release, and was later released as the fifth track on the band's 2007 debut album The Good, the Bad and the Queen.

The song was released to the iTunes Store on 9 October 2006, and a stream of the song is available on the band's website. The artwork for the single was created by the band's bassist Paul Simonon.

Track listings 
Promo CD
"Herculean" (radio edit)
"Herculean" (album version)
7" R6722
"Herculean" – 4:03
"Mr. Whippy" (featuring Eslam Jawaad) – 3:15
Digipak Maxi-CD CDR6722
"Herculean" – 4:03
"Back in the Day" – 5:33
"Mr. Whippy" (featuring Eslam Jawaad) – 3:15

Personnel 
Damon Albarn: vocals, piano, acoustic guitar
Danger Mouse: synthesizers
Simon Tong: electric guitar
Paul Simonon: bass guitar
James Dring: drum programming
Tony Allen: drums
Demon Strings: orchestration
The Sixteen: additional vocals

Chart performance 
"Herculean" entered the UK Singles Chart at #22 in its first week of physical release (2006-11-05). The next week it retained a spot in the Top 75, at #72, but dropped out entirely the following week.

References

External links 

2006 songs
2006 debut singles
Parlophone singles
Songs written by Damon Albarn
The Good, the Bad and the Queen songs
Song recordings produced by Danger Mouse (musician)